Robert McLaughlin (6 December 1925 – 25 April 2003) was a Northern Irish professional footballer who played as a wing half.

Career
Born in Belfast, McLaughlin played for Distillery, Wrexham, Cardiff City, Southampton, Headington United, Yeovil Town and Salisbury City.

References

1925 births
2003 deaths
Association footballers from Northern Ireland
Lisburn Distillery F.C. players
Wrexham A.F.C. players
Cardiff City F.C. players
Southampton F.C. players
Oxford United F.C. players
Yeovil Town F.C. players
Salisbury City F.C. players
English Football League players
Association football wing halves